The Corallinophycidae is a grouping of several calcifying red algal lineages recovered by molecular analysis.

Orders 
According to AlgaeBase, it contains;
 Order	Corallinales  (826 species)
 Order	Corallinapetrales  (2)
 Order	Corallinophycidae ord. incertae sedis (6)
 Order	Rhodogorgonales	 (18)
 Order	Sporolithales  (61)

References 

Florideophyceae
Bikont subclasses